Laurentia is a bioregion atop the Laurentian craton in eastern North America, centering on the Great Lakes.

The bioregion spans the Eastern Woodlands of North America from the easternmost part of the Great Plains to the Atlantic Coast of the Northeastern United States and Canadian Maritimes. From north to south, it spans from the edge of the boreal forest in Canada, generally up to approximately the 50th parallel give or take a couple degrees of latitude and south to approximately the Ohio River, Potomac River and Ozarks.

The largest ecoregion within Laurentia is called the Laurentian Mixed Forest Province.

Regional identity

Along with the bioregional similarities throughout the region, and the water cycle of the Great Lakes and regional namesake Saint Lawrence River, there are also strong cultural and economic connections in Laurentia. The Ambassador Bridge between Detroit and Windsor, Ontario is the busiest border crossing in North America.

The Laurentian region was the destination of freed black slaves during the days of the Underground Railroad, both in the northern U.S. states and in Canada. In the nineteenth century, the border was porous and to this day family ties between American and Canadian Laurentians continue.

Laurentia includes many of the largest North American cities, including New York City, Chicago, Philadelphia, Washington, D.C., Boston, Toronto, Detroit, Indianapolis, St. Louis, Cleveland, Montreal, Cincinnati, Pittsburgh, Baltimore, Milwaukee, Buffalo, Columbus and Minneapolis/St. Paul.

See also

Cascadia, the northwestern North American bioregion, also including parts of the United States and Canada, with an active independence movement
Laurentia, a geological craton
Niagara Falls

References

Ecoregions of Canada
Ecoregions of the United States
Great Lakes